Anyentyuwe (–1904), also known by her English name Janie Harrington, was a Mpongwe teacher, feminist and missionary nurse. Daughter to prominent, educated parents (her father was chief missionary leader and trader Sonie "John" Harrington), she was raised on the Gabonese coast of Africa, in the French occupied territory of Libreville, Gabon. Anyentyume traveled some, but spent the majority of her adult life within this area, teaching and doing missionary work. She was an advocate for women in her outspokenness against the double standard in expectations between men and women.

Education 
Anyentyuwe was known as her father's favorite of many siblings,  and he took great care in raising her to be virtuous and moral. Because Anyentyuwe's mother died when she was very young and Sonie's work kept him traveling, he placed her in the care of Mrs. Bushnell at the Mission at Baraka, a nearby American-run Protestant school. With the death of Anyentyuwe's father when she was about 13, Mrs. Bushnell became her primary caregiver. She took Anyentyuwe's education very seriously and personally oversaw her studies.  Because of this, Anyentyuwe was educated in a much more expansive variety of subjects than the other students, including History, Physiology, Composition and Math.

Work 

When Anyentyuwe completed her studies, she began teaching at the Mission School. Before his death, her father had asked her to promise that she would maintain her virtue, and remain with the missionaries, and Anyentuwe took this promise seriously. She worked at the school for many years, for low wages, rationed food, and often being mistreated by the male American missionaries. Her work there only ended after she Anyentuwe reported being raped by 2 of the missionaries at the Mission. She was not believed, and was banished from the only place she'd called home since she was a small child.

Later in life, she went to work as a personal nanny/nurse to the child of Robert Hamill Nassau, a renowned missionary doctor. Their relationship evolved into a deep friendship. When Dr. Nassau began authoring his books, Fetichism in West Africa and Tales out of School, Anyentyuwe became an incredibly valuable collaborator and contributor, with her firsthand knowledge about Gabonese spiritual practices and the early days of the Protestant mission in Gabon.

Personal life 

Despite opportunities, Anyentyuwe never married. As a result of one of the rapes, she did get pregnant and give birth to a daughter, Iga, in 1882. She enjoyed the companionship and professional relationship she shared with her longtime friend mentioned above, Robert Hamill Nassau, but maintained that they never had any romantic ties.

Feminism 
Throughout her time at the Mission, Anyentyuwe was challenged by the male missionaries. She was constantly required to "prove" her chasteness, and often spoke up about the misogynistic views on women's clothing and behavior expectations. It was uncommon for women to report any kind of harassment or rape in colonial Africa, and  while her report was not prosecuted, just the act of her reporting it at all was very controversial. When she was working with Nasseu, their relationship was under constant scrutiny within the Protestant community, despite their continued assurance that they were close friends and professional colleagues; her outspoken denial of these accusations of sexual impropriety caused strife and gave her a rebellious reputation.

References 

Gabonese educators
Year of birth missing
1904 deaths
Date of death missing